Ciarán Teehan (born 15 March 1999 in Cork) is a professional Irish darts player who plays in the Professional Darts Corporation events.

Career
Teehan qualified for the 2020 PDC World Darts Championship via the PDC Development Tour rankings. He defeated Ross Smith 3-0 in the round of 96 before narrowly losing his second game to Mervyn King.

He won PDC Challenge Tour event 17 of 2019. He was  awarded a Tour Card for 2020 and 2021 by virtue of finishing on second place on the 2019 PDC Development Tour, reaching 3 semi finals and 2 finals on the tour.

He reached the quarter finals of the 2019 L180 World Masters losing to Mike Warburton.

Teehan qualified in the 2021 PDC World Darts Championship, he lost his first game to Wayne Jones by 2–3.

World Championship results

PDC
 2020: Second round (lost to Mervyn King 2–3)  
 2021: First round (lost to Wayne Jones 2–3)

Performance timeline

References

External links

1999 births
Living people
Irish darts players
Professional Darts Corporation former tour card holders